CleanTechnica is a US-based website dedicated to aggregating news in clean technology, sustainable energy, and electric vehicles, with a focus on Tesla.

Content 
CleanTechnica publishes stories on a wide range of topics that are cited by mainstream media such as Business Insider (on Lindsey Graham), Reuters (on nanotech for energy storage), ThinkProgress (on wind power in Texas), The Washington Post (on suburban living), Forbes (on the Byton M-Byte) and Slate (on mask stockpiling during the COVID-19 pandemic). ThinkProgress have also published their stories in full.

In addition to their own stories CleanTechnica publish interviews with notable individuals within clean technology such as fellow at the Post Carbon Institute Richard Heinberg. In collaboration with the quarterly magazine The Beam Magazine CleanTechnica publish their stories. Starting in 2015 CleanTechnica have held an annual vote among its readers to select a Car of the Year.

Staff 
The site director is Zach Shahan, who in 2013 was found by an Appinions Auto Tech Influence Study to be a top 20 influencer in fuel economy with the top three being Elon Musk, The New York Timess John Broder and Barack Obama.

Apart from its own staff CleanTechnica have accepted guest contributions from others, such as California Governor (then mayor of San Francisco) Gavin Newsom.

References

External links

American technology news websites
Internet properties established in 2008
Transport websites